Ikaruga-dera (斑鳩寺) is a Buddhist temple in Taishi, Hyōgo Prefecture, Japan. It was founded by Prince Shōtoku in 606.

It should not be confused with Hōryū-ji in Nara, which also uses this appellation historically.

See also 
Historical Sites of Prince Shōtoku

External links 
Pilgrimage website

Buddhist temples in Hyōgo Prefecture
Prince Shōtoku